The Spire of Hope is an outdoor sculpture located in Belfast, Northern Ireland. The 40-metre spire is built into the roof of St Anne's Cathedral in the city's Cathedral Quarter.

In April 2007 the steel spire was installed on top of the cathedral. The structure is illuminated at night and is part of a wider redevelopment planned for the Cathedral Quarter. The base section of the spire protrudes through a glass platform in the cathedral's roof directly above the choir stalls, allowing visitors to view it from the nave.

References

Outdoor sculptures in Northern Ireland
Steel sculptures in Northern Ireland
2007 sculptures